Mistaken Identity is the sixth studio album by American singer Kim Carnes, released in April 1981 by EMI America Records. The album spent four weeks at number one on the Billboard 200, and was subsequently certified platinum by the Recording Industry Association of America (RIAA). It was nominated for the Grammy Award for Album of the Year.

The album's lead single "Bette Davis Eyes" peaked at number one on the Billboard Hot 100 for nine non-consecutive weeks and topped the Hot 100 year-end chart of 1981. Follow-up singles "Draw of the Cards" and "Mistaken Identity" reached numbers 28 and 60 on the Billboard Hot 100, respectively.

Record World said of the title track that "Dreamy sax/keyboard colors provide the backdrop for [Carnes'] vocal longing."

Release and promotion
The album's supporting tour, titled the Mistaken Identity Summer Tour '81, ran from August to October 1981, split into two legs. The first leg began in Dallas, Texas on August 16. It was Carnes' first time headlining a tour. Gary U.S. Bonds was the support act.

Commercial performance
Mistaken Identity became Carnes' best-selling album, and her first to chart within the US Top 40. It entered the Billboard 200 at no. 66 in the week of May 2, 1981, and climbed to No. 1 in its ninth week. It spent a total of four weeks at the top of the chart, selling 1 million copies and earning Platinum certification. The album's success was buoyed by its lead single "Bette Davis Eyes", which spent nine non-consecutive weeks at No. 1 on the Billboard Hot 100 between May and July 1981. Subsequent singles "Draw of the Cards" and "Mistaken Identity" peaked at No. 28 and No. 60, respectively.

Track listing

Personnel
Credits adapted from the liner notes of Mistaken Identity.

Musicians

 Kim Carnes – lead vocals ; piano 
 Bill Cuomo – arrangements ; Prophet
 Steve Goldstein – keyboards
 Bryan Garofalo – bass, background vocals
 Craig Krampf – drums, background vocals
 Craig Hull – electric guitar, slide guitar, background vocals
 Josh Leo – electric guitar, acoustic guitar, mandolin, background vocals
 M. L. Benoit – percussion
 Jerry Peterson – saxophone
 Waddy Wachtel – electric guitar ; acoustic guitar ; harmony vocals ; background vocals
 Danny Kortchmar – acoustic guitar 
 Don Francisco – percussion 
 Dave Ellingson – harmony vocals ; background vocals
 Daniel Moore – harmony vocals ; background vocals
 Wendy Waldman – harmony vocals 
 Maxine Willard Waters – harmony vocals 
 Julia Tillman Waters – harmony vocals

Technical
 Val Garay – production, recording
 Niko Bolas – engineering assistance
 Doug Sax – mastering
 Mike Reese – mastering

Artwork
 Bill Burks – art direction, design
 David Alexander – photo

Charts

Weekly charts

Year-end charts

Certifications and sales

References

Bibliography

 

1981 albums
Albums produced by Val Garay
EMI America Records albums
Kim Carnes albums